Budget Padmanabhan is a 2000 Indian Tamil-language comedy film. The film stars Prabhu and Ramya Krishnan. It was remade in Telugu as Budget Padmanabham with Ramya Krishnan reprising her role.

Plot 
When he was a young boy, Padmanabhan was driven out of his house along with his parents by an evil-hearted money lender, who gave him a condition: if by a stipulated time period Padmanabhan could raise enough money to buy back the house he could reclaim it as his own.

Since then, Padmanabhan has been living a very thrifty life, always counting the cost of his daily expenses. Even after marriage to Ramya, he still focuses on his finances, at times to the detriment of his personal relationships with his wife and relatives, who all live together in a small house. In a sub-plot, Padmanabhan hires a housemaid, who turns out to be the estranged and separated wife of his boss's son.

The story focuses on Padmanabhan's attempt to raise the money to buy back his house and his struggles to adapt with changes in his life, including Ramya giving birth to triplets. But he gradually learns about the importance of relationships and human values and how some things in life are more important than money.

In a final twist to the story, after raising the money, Padmanabhan realises that it has been stolen from his motorcycle. In despair he is about to give up and officially hand over the house to the money lender, but then his boss's son helps him out by providing him the money just in time. The earlier delighted money lender is now shocked at realising that he must give up the house where his family members have long since settled, and orders his relatives to pack up and leave. He drags his two children out of the house and they burst into tears at the prospect of having to leave because they do not wish to do so. The weeping boys then plead with Padmanabhan to let them stay and promise him that they will buy him a much bigger house when they grow up. Padmanabhan, moved to tears, recalls his own heartbreak at being dragged out of his childhood home and agrees to let the family stay until the children have grown up. This puts the money lender to shame and contrition, and he admits having arranged for Padmanabhan's money to be stolen because he knew that he would raise the money eventually. He returns the money and asks for Padmanabhan's forgiveness, having realised the strength of his adversary's moral character.

At the end of the film, the housemaid Omana, who had since reunited with her long lost love, gives birth to triplets of her own in hospital.

Cast 

 Prabhu as Padmanabhan
 Ramya Krishnan as Ramya
 Vivek as Krishnan
 Mumtaj as Omana
 Kovai Sarala as Padmanabhan's cousin
 Manivannan as Padmanabhan's cousin's husband
 Karan as Abishek
 Nizhalgal Ravi as Moneylender (Seth)
 Omakuchi Narasimhan as Vadakkan Veeragatha Mambatti
 Idichapuli Selvaraj as House Owner
 T. P. Gajendran as Lawyer
 Rajesh
 Theni Kunjarammal
 Santhana Bharathi

Production 
T. P. Gajendran claimed that success of Thirupathi Ezhumalai Venkatesa prompted him to return to films. Gajendran initially wanted this story to be adapted into tele film, since no producer was willing to accept, it was K. R. G who agreed to produce the film.

The film saw teaming of Prabhu, Ramya Krishnan and Mumtaj for first. The story was written by Arunchalam and the dialogues by Prasanna Kumar. Shooting was planned to be completed in a single schedule at locations in Chennai and Ooty. Since the story has the lead character staying in a colony, a huge set of the colony was erected at the Arunachalam Studio, complete with shops, lanes and houses.

Soundtrack 
Music was composed by S. A. Rajkumar, with lyrics by Vairamuthu.

Reception 
Malathi Rangarajan of The Hindu wrote, "Prabhu is the hero, but it is Vivek who steals the show [...] Prabhu seems to have lost his agility and briskness and this factor affects his performance too". Malini Mannath wrote for Chennai Online, "This is a film that could be described as a wholesome family entertainer. It has lots of sentiment, a bit of action and comedy, all meant for a type of audience. A film that a discerning viewer would give the miss". The film bagged first place in the  Tamil Nadu State Film Award for Best Family Film for the year 2000.

Remakes 
The film was remade in Telugu as Budget Padmanabham with Ramya Krishnan reprising her role, in Malayalam as Vasanthamalika in 2003 and in Kannada as Jipuna Nanna Ganda.

References

External links 
 

2000 comedy films
2000 films
2000s Tamil-language films
Films directed by T. P. Gajendran
Films shot in Ooty
Indian comedy films
Tamil films remade in other languages